Department of Children, Youth and Families can refer to:
Delaware Department of Services for Children, Youth, and Their Families
New Mexico Children, Youth, and Families Department
Rhode Island Department of Children, Youth & Families
Washington Department of Children, Youth, and Families

See also
 Department of Children and Family Services